Missulena rutraspina is a species of mygalomorph spiders in the family Actinopodidae. It is found in Western Australia.

References

rutraspina
Spiders described in 1995